Samantha Boscarino (born December 26, 1994) is an American actress from Ventura County, California. She is known for the film The Clique, for her role as Molly Garfunkel on the Nickelodeon series How to Rock, and for her lead role as Ellie Davis in the 2016 television film The Cheerleader Murders.

Career
Her first notable role was as Alicia Rivera in the film The Clique, produced by Tyra Banks, and costarring Bridgit Mendler. In 2009, she appeared in The Perfect Game as Gloria Jimenez and in Jonas as Amy. Boscarino also appeared in Parenthood as Lindsay and True Jackson, VP as Carla Gustav. Boscarino also had a nine-episode recurring role in Good Luck Charlie as Skyler, reuniting her with Mendler.  In mid-2010, she appeared as Lisa Cucuy in Wizards of Waverly Place. In 2011, she made an appearance on Bucket & Skinner's Epic Adventures as C.J.

In 2012, Boscarino was cast as Molly Garfunkel on the Nickelodeon series How to Rock. The series premiered on February 4, 2012, and ended on December 8, 2012. She made several appearances on Figure It Out as a panelist. In 2016, Boscarino was the lead in the Lifetime television film, The Cheerleader Murders, playing the role of Ellie.

Filmography

References

External links
 
 

1994 births
21st-century American actresses
Actresses from California
American child actresses
American film actresses
American television actresses
Living people
People from Ventura County, California